Fuerza Amarilla Sporting Club was an Ecuadorian football club based in Machala, Ecuador. Founded on 23 December 1999, the club played in the Ecuadorian Serie A. Its home games are played at Estadio 9 de Mayo, which has a capacity of 16,456 seats. 

The club has participated in a CONMEBOL competition once, in the 2017 Copa Sudamericana. In that tournament, they were drawn in the first stage with Chilean club O'Higgins and beat them 2–1 on aggregate, after having a 1–0 deficit. In the next stage, they were eliminated by Colombian club Santa Fe 2–1 on aggregate.

Honours
Serie B de Ecuador
Runner-up (1): 2015

Current squad
As of March 27, 2017.

External links

Fuerza Amarilla at Ecuadorian Football Federation

Football clubs in Ecuador
Association football clubs established in 1999
1999 establishments in Ecuador
Machala
Association football clubs disestablished in 2022